"Baby Take Me in Your Arms" is a 1968 song composed by Tony Macaulay and John Macleod.

The most famous recording of the song was by Jefferson in late 1969. Jefferson's version became a Top 40 pop and adult contemporary hit during the winter of 1970 in the U.S. and Canada. Although the artist, Geoffrey Turton, is British and the LP was released in the UK, the single was not. "Baby Take Me in Your Arms" went to No. 12 on WABC-AM in New York City.

Chart history

Weekly charts

Other versions
The Paper Dolls recorded the song in 1968, before Jefferson's version, on their album, Paper Dolls House. Their version was not released as a single.
Bobby Vinton covered "Baby Take Me in Your Arms" on his 1970 LP My Elusive Dreams.
Under the truncated title "Take Me in Your Arms," Edison Lighthouse covered the song on their 1971 LP, Already.

See also
List of 1970s one-hit wonders in the United States

References

External links
 Lyrics of this song
  
 

Songs written by Tony Macaulay
Songs written by John Macleod (songwriter)
1968 songs
1969 singles
1960s ballads
British songs